Costulopsis hadfieldi is a species of sea snail, a gastropod in the family Cerithiopsidae. It was described by Jay and Drivas, in 2002.

Distribution
This marine species occurs off Madagascar.

References

 Cecalupo A. & Robba E. (2010) The identity of Murex tubercularis Montagu, 1803 and description of one new genus and two new species of the Cerithiopsidae (Gastropoda: Triphoroidea). Bollettino Malacologico 46: 45-64. 
 Cecalupo A. & Perugia I. (2014). The Cerithiopsidae (Caenogastropoda: Triphoroidea) of South Madagascar (Indian Ocean). Bollettino Malacologico. 50: 75-126
 Cecalupo A. & Robba E. (2019). Costulopsis nom. nov., a replacement name for the Gastropoda genus Nanopsis Cecalupo & Robba, 2010 (Mollusca: Gastropoda: Cerithiopsidae), preoccupied by Nanopsis Henningsmoen, 1954 (Arthropoda: Ostracoda: Beyrichiidae). Bollettino Malacologico. 55(1): 65-67.

External links
 Jay M. & Drivas J. (2002). The Cerithiopsidae (Gastropoda) of Reunion Island (Indian Ocean). Novapex 3(1): 1-45

Cerithiopsidae
Gastropods described in 2002